Colonel General Lkhagvasuren Jamiyan was a Mongolian statesman and military leader in the Mongolian People's Republic.  From 1939 to 1980, he was a member of the Presidium of the Central Committee and a candidate member, and then a member of the Politburo of the Central Committee of the Mongolian People's Revolutionary Party. In 1940-1947 he was a deputy of the Small Khural, and in 1951 he became a member of the Great People's Khural.

Biography

Early life and World War Two
He was born into a family of a military officers. At the age of 20, he voluntarily entered the service in the Mongolian People's Revolutionary Army, serving in the 15th Cavalry Division. In 1935 he became a member of the Mongolian People's Revolutionary Party. For two years (1935-1937) he received military education in Moscow, graduating from courses at the Lenin Military-Political Academy. After graduation, until 1938, he continued to serve at the academy as the head of a group of Mongolian cadets.

Upon returning to Mongolia in January 1939, he was appointed head of the Political Council and Deputy Supreme Commander-in-Chief of the Mongolian People's Revolutionary Army. He took part in the Battles of Khalkhin Gol in 1939 and also participated in the hostilities of the Soviet–Japanese War. During the battles, he, in his position as Corps Commissar of the MPRA, was Marshal Georgy Zhukov's deputy in command of the Mongolian cavalry. Towards the end of the war, he also served with General Issa Pliyev in the Soviet-Mongolian Cavalry-Mechanized Group of the Transbaikal Front. In 1944, he became one of the first generals of the Mongolian Army.

Post-war
In 1951, he graduated from the Frunze Military Academy in Moscow. Beginning in 1955, he became Chief of the General Staff of the People's Army. In this position, he was responsible for the renovation works at the Sükhbaatar's Mausoleum. In 1956, he headed the committee for physical culture and sports, and became the first president of the Mongolian National Olympic Committee. For a decade, he was the Minister of People's Troops (in 1968 the ministry was renamed the Ministry of Defense) and commander-in-chief of the Mongolian People's Army. In this position, he undertook a significant reorganization of the Mongolian military. After ten years of work in July 1969 he was summoned to a meeting of the Politburo and was dismissed.

Later he served for two years as Ambassador Extraordinary and Plenipotentiary to Bulgaria and Poland. He was then elected Deputy Chairman of the Presidium of the Great People's Khural. He retired in March 1982 at the age of 70 and died two months later of a heart attack.

Legacy 
In 2012, Mongolia celebrated the centenary of his birth. The 167th Military Unit of the Mongolian Ground Force is named after him.

References 

Mongolian military personnel
1912 births
1982 deaths
Frunze Military Academy alumni
Ministers of Defence of Mongolia